Ormetica pallidifascia is a moth of the family Erebidae. It was described by Walter Rothschild in 1933. It is found in Brazil.

References

Ormetica
Moths described in 1933